Nicola Whitton  is an academic, author, and speaker.

Academic career 
Nicola Whitton is the Director of Durham Centre for Academic Development and a Professor of Education at Durham University. Prior to joining the University Whitton worked as a Professor of Professional Learning at Manchester Metropolitan University.

Whitton holds a doctorate in the use of educational games for learning and her research focuses on the play in adulthood, in particular games and learning in the context of Higher Education, and the potential of play in teaching, research, and academic practice. 

Whitton's most recent projects have focused on the potential of escape room design for learning. Whitton has also published many books and articles in the field of playfulness, games and learning. Whitton was the founder of the Playful Learning Network and former co-chair. Whitton also co-created the Playful Learning Conference which she co-chaired for the first 5 years (2016-2022).

Bibliography 
Whitton, N. (2014). Digital games and learning: research and theory. New York: Routledge.
Whitton, N. (2012). The place of game-based learning in an age of austerity. European Journal of E-Learning. 10/2, 249–256.
Whitton, N. & Moseley, A. (2012). Using games to enhance learning and teaching. Education. New York: Routledge.
Whitton, N. (2011). Game engagement theory and adult learning. Simulation & Gaming, 42/5, 597–610.
Whitton, N. (2010). Learning with Digital Games: A Practical Guide to Engaging Students in Higher Education. New York: Routledge.

References

External links 
Nicola Whitton's Playful Learning Blog - Play Think Learn
Nicola Whitton Homepage at the University of Durham

British women non-fiction writers
1972 births
Living people
Academics of Durham University
People educated at Boroughmuir High School
British women academics